David Andreas Nyfjäll (born 26 January 1999) is a Swedish golfer. He was part of the teams winning the 2017 Jacques Léglise Trophy, the 2019 European Amateur Team Championship and the 2019 Arnold Palmer Cup.

Amateur career
Nyfjäll won his first international title at the 2013 Finnish Junior International Championship and was a semifinalist at the 2016 Boys Amateur Championship at Muirfield in Scotland. In 2017, he was third at the German Boys Open, and in 2018 third at the Lytham Trophy.

In 2018, Nyfjäll became the first male player to win both the Swedish Junior Matchplay Championship and the Swedish Junior Strokeplay Championship in the same year. Jonas Blixt had previously won both tournaments, but not in the same season. 

Nyfjäll appeared for the National Team at the European Boys' Team Championship in 2017, finishing fourth. He was a member of the winning Continental European Team in the 2017 Jacques Léglise Trophy against Great Britain and Ireland. He appeared in the European Amateur Team Championship four times and won the 2019 event at Ljunghusen Golf Club with Albin Bergström, Vincent Norrman, Christoffer Pålsson, Pontus Nyholm and Ludvig Åberg. Nyfjäll won the bronze at the 2020 event in the Netherlands together with Gustav Andersson, Albin Bergström and Vincent Norrman.

Nyfjäll accepted a scholarship to Northwestern University and started playing with the Northwestern Wildcats men's golf team in 2018. He was awarded Big Ten Conference Freshman of the Year after two individual titles and a 71.72 stroke average, the lowest average from any first-year in program history, including Luke Donald. 

He played in the 2019 Scandinavian Invitation on the European Tour and made the cut.

Nyfjäll advanced to the round of 16 at the 2021 U.S. Amateur at Oakmont Country Club, after triumphing in a 12-man playoff for the last match play spot.

Nyfjäll won the 2022 Big Ten Championship by firing a 1-under 215 at the Pete Dye Course at French Lick Resort. He was the only golfer in the 72-man field to finish the weekend under par, becoming Northwestern's first medalist at the event since David Lipsky in 2010.

Amateur wins
2013 Finnish Junior International Championship Boys 14, Skandia Tour Regional #3 Gästrike-Hälsinge
2014 Skandia Cup Riksfinal P15
2015 Vassunda Junior Open 
2016 Callaway Cup
2017 Swedish Junior Matchplay Championship, Viksjö Junior Open, Salem Junior Open, Junior Masters Invitational - Final 
2018 Swedish Junior Matchplay Championship, Swedish Junior Strokeplay Championship, GolfTech Tour 1, Chatham Hills Collegiate, UNCG Grandover Collegiate
2021 GCAA Summers Series - Indiana
2022 Big Ten Championship

Sources:

Team appearances
Amateur
Jacques Léglise Trophy (representing Continental Europe): 2017 (winners)
European Boys' Team Championship (representing Sweden): 2017
European Amateur Team Championship (representing Sweden): 2018, 2019 (winners), 2020, 2021, 2022
Arnold Palmer Cup (representing the International Team): 2019 (winners)

Source:

References

External links

Swedish male golfers
Amateur golfers
Northwestern Wildcats men's golfers
Sportspeople from Uppsala
1999 births
Living people